Careen Pilo Selangai who writes as Careen Pilo is an author, writer, and diplomat from Cameroon.

Career 
Pilo has written four romantic works of fiction, an academic paper on gender in sub-Saharan Africa, and a United Nation Development Programme report on Conflict Prevention and Peacebuilding in the Democratic Republic of the Congo.

Since 2017, Pilo has worked as the First Secretary at the Cameroonian embassy to Italy, in Rome.

Selected publications 

 Pilo, Careen, Les marées affriolantes de l’amour. 2019, L'Harmattan, ISBN 978-9-956-63747-8
 Pilo, Careen, Under the charm of a prostitute, 2009, L'Harmattan, ISBN 9782296086302
 Pilo, Careen, Prévention Des Conflits et construction de la paix: le PNUD en RDC, 2018, UNDP, ISBN 9786131599552
 Pilo, Careen, Les Vagues tumultueuses de l’amour, 2016, L'Harmattan, ISBN 978-2343068763
 Pilo, Careen, Quand l'espoir se réveille..., 2013, L'Harmattan, ISBN 9782336009209
 Lee, Jin-rang; Hong, Sol; Selangai, Careen Pilo; Bonchi, Binangma; Ahoua, Magloire; and Diouf, Nathalie, Analysis of ODA Projects on Gender Equality in Sub-Saharan Africa: Using Moser's Gender Diagnostic Tool 국제지역연구 19.2 (2015) (in Korean)

See also 

 Foreign relations of Cameroon

References 

Living people
Cameroonian writers
21st-century Cameroonian women writers
Cameroonian women diplomats
Year of birth missing (living people)